C-5 was a hydrogen inflated C class blimp operated by the U.S. Navy in 1918 and 1919. It was one of ten C class non-rigid airships constructed by Goodyear and Goodrich primarily for patrol duty and training for the navy during World War I.

History
The C-5's engines were built by Hispano-Suiza, and its control car was built by Curtiss Aeroplane and Motor Company. In early May 1919, the C-5 made a pioneering flight from its home base at Cape May, New Jersey to Montauk Point, New York and St. John's, Newfoundland, becoming the first airship to reach that city and in the process sending the first radio voice transmission from Newfoundland. The C-5's goal was to fly across the Atlantic, paralleling the route used by the U.S. seaplane NC-4. Previous attempts to cross the Atlantic Ocean in a balloon or dirigible were unsuccessful. The most famous of these attempts was that of the airship America in October 1910.

On 14 May 1919, the C-5 departed Montauk Point in clear weather. The ship made good time, but encountered heavy fog and thunderstorms near Saint Pierre Island and became lost for several hours. The blimp eventually regained its way, but the extended trip caused the crew to exhaust their food supply and wind and rain continuously tossed and buffeted the blimp. Many of the crew became airsick. The blimp pitched and rolled so heavily that the engines stalled several times and had to be restarted. The C-5 again became lost, this time over Newfoundland itself, when its radio navigation equipment malfunctioned. The blimp's crew used its voice radio to contact the U.S. Navy cruiser , which was in St. John's, and the radio signal was used to guide the C-5 to the tracks of the Colonial Railroad, which it followed to St. John's and a safe landing at 11 a.m. on 15 May. The commander of the blimp, Lieutenant Commander Coll, said it was the roughest trip he had ever experienced.

Most of the crew left the blimp to eat lunch and sleep, while the few remaining men began to service the airship's engines. In the meantime, a storm rolled in and additional cables were tied over the blimp in order to secure it and crewmen from the Chicago were brought in to help.
 with higher gusts, and the blimp began to break free from its additional cables. The engines couldn't be restarted because they were partially disassembled, so Lieutenant Charles Little attempted to pull the emergency cord to open the gasbag and deflate it. The cord broke, and the C-5 began to lift off, tearing loose a few remaining cables that injured two crewmen as they sprang loose. Little jumped from the rising blimp, injuring his ankle, and the C-5 was blown eastward, over the Atlantic Ocean.

The destroyer  was dispatched to retrieve the blimp, which continued to drift.  Later news reports that the C-5 crashed into the Atlantic and was found by a passing British ship were false. There were also reports that the C-5 may have been sighted over Ireland and the Azores, but these were never substantiated. The C-5 was never seen again.

On the same day the C-5 broke loose from its moorings, the British government announced plans to send the airship R-34 on a transatlantic flight to Cape May, the C-5's home base. That airship successfully crossed the Atlantic, becoming the first aircraft to navigate that body of water from east to west nonstop.

Specifications (typical C class blimp)

References 
 "Blimp Loosed By Gale; The Navy Dirigible C-5, Blown to Sea from Newfoundland and Picked Up by British Ship." The New York Times. 16 May 1919. pp. 1
 "Our Runaway Airship Captured by British Ship Eighty-five Miles at Sea, East of St. John's, N.F.", The New York Times. 16 May 1919. pp. 1
 Shock, James R. US Navy Airships. Edgewater, Florida: Atlantic Press, 2001. pp. 22–27. .

1910s United States patrol aircraft
Airships of the United States Navy
Goodyear aircraft
Aircraft first flown in 1918